The varied bunting (Passerina versicolor) is a species of songbird in the cardinal family, Cardinalidae.

The range of the varied bunting stretches from the southern parts of Arizona, New Mexico, and Texas in the United States south throughout Mexico as far as Oaxaca. Small disjunct populations occur in the state of Chiapas in Mexico and southeastern Guatemala. This stocky bird has a short tail and rounded bill. Breeding males are purple-red with a bright red patch on the nape, which becomes browner in the fall. Females are plain light brown, resembling the female indigo bunting but lacking streaking on the breast. Varied buntings inhabit deserts and xeric shrublands, preferring thorny brush thickets, thorn forests, scrubby woodlands, and overgrown clearings. They forage on the ground for insects, fruit, and seeds. Varied buntings weave open-cup nests of grass and spider webs in the outer branches of thorny shrubs, usually near water. Females lay two to five bluish-white to bluish-green eggs, which they incubate for about fourteen days. The young are fully feathered after 10 days, and are ready to leave the nest several days later.

References

Further reading

Book
 Groschupf, K. D., and C. W. Thompson. 1998. Varied Bunting (Passerina versicolor). In The Birds of North America, No. 351 (A. Poole and F. Gill, eds.). The Birds of North America, Inc., Philadelphia, PA.

Thesis
 Klicka JT. Ph.D. (1999). A molecular perspective on the evolution of North American songbirds. University of Minnesota, United States—Minnesota.

Articles
 Klicka J, Fry AJ, Zink RM & Thompson CW. (2001). A cytochrome-b perspective on Passerina bunting relationships. Auk. vol 118, no 3. p. 611-623.
 Thompson WL. (1968). The Songs of 5 Species of Passerina Passerina-Leclancherii Passerina-Ciris Passerina-Versicolor Passerina-Cyanea Passerina-Amoena. Behaviour. vol 31, no 3/4. p. 261-287.
 Woolfenden GE & Van Deventer M. (2006). First record of the varied bunting from Florida. Florida Field Naturalist. vol 34, no 1. p. 1-3.

External links

Photo-High Res; Article
Varied bunting photo gallery VIREO

varied bunting
Native birds of the Southwestern United States
Birds of the Rio Grande valleys
Birds of Mexico
Birds of Guatemala
varied bunting
varied bunting